William Wyatt "Nipper" Pinching was a rugby union international who represented England in 1872.

Early life
Nipper Pinching was born on 24 March 1851 in Gravesend, the third son of CJ Pinching. He attended Charterhouse School and went on to study medicine at Guy's Hospital Medical School.

Rugby union career
Pinching made his international debut on 5 February 1872 at The Oval in the England vs Scotland match.
This was the only match he played.

Later life
Pinching became a surgeon but his life and career were cut short when he was lost overboard from the SS Eldorado, one day's sail from Colombo, on 16 August 1878.

References

1851 births
1878 deaths
England international rugby union players
English rugby union players
People educated at Charterhouse School
People who died at sea
Rugby union forwards
Rugby union players from Gravesend, Kent